Ivan van Zyl (born 30 June 1995) is a South African rugby union player for Saracens. His regular position is scrum-half.

Career

Youth
Van Zyl represented the Blue Bulls as early as primary school level, appearing at the Under-13 Craven Week competition in 2008. In July 2013, he also played for them at the premier South African high school rugby competition, the Under-18 Craven Week held in Polokwane. He made three appearances and scored two tries in a personal haul of 25 points.

Under-20
Van Zyl was named in a 37-man training squad for the South Africa national under-20 rugby union team and featured for them in a friendly match against a Varsity Cup Dream Team in April 2015. He was also included in the squad that embarked on a two-match tour of Argentina. He came on as a replacement in their 25–22 victory over Argentina and started their 39–28 victory a few days later.

Upon the team's return, Van Zyl was named in the final squad for the 2015 World Rugby Under 20 Championship. He started all three of their matches in Pool B of the competition; a 33–5 win against hosts Italy, a 40–8 win against Samoa and a 46–13 win over Australia to help South Africa finish top of Pool B to qualify for the semi-finals with the best record pool stage of all the teams in the competition. Van Zyl started their semi-final match against England, but could not prevent them losing 20–28 to be eliminated from the competition by England for the second year in succession and also started their third-place play-off match against France, helping South Africa to a 31–18 win to secure third place in the competition.

Senior level

In June 2015, Van Zyl extended his contract at the Bulls until October 2017. He was included in the  squad for the 2015 Currie Cup Premier Division and named in the matchday squad for all eleven of their matches in the competition. He appeared as a replacement in five of their remaining six matches during the regular season of the season, helping the Blue Bulls finish in second position to qualify for the play-offs. He played off the bench in their semi-final match against Western Province, but could not prevent the side from Cape Town winning 23–18 to eliminate the Blue Bulls from the competition.

In 2016, Van Zyl was included in the ' squad for the 2016 Super Rugby season.

On 23 February 2021, Van Zyl signs for Saracens ahead of the 2021–22 season.

Springbok debut
Van Zyl made his Test debut for the senior Springboks on 2 June 2018 against Wales in Washington, D.C. at the age of 22 years.

Honours
 Super Rugby Unlocked winner 2020
 Currie Cup winner 2020–21
 Pro14 Rainbow Cup runner-up 2021
 Premiership Rugby runner up 2021-22

References

External links
 
 

South African rugby union players
Living people
1995 births
Rugby union players from Pretoria
Rugby union scrum-halves
Blue Bulls players
South Africa Under-20 international rugby union players
South Africa international rugby union players
Bulls (rugby union) players
Saracens F.C. players